Julia María Alba Alarcó  (born May 30, 1972) is a retired Spanish sprinter.

Alba was born in Seville. She finished ninth in the 200 metres in the 2002 IAAF World Cup, and competed at the 1999 World Championships without reaching the final. She also competed in 400 metres at the 2001 World Championships.

Alba has 23.56 seconds in the 200 metres, achieved at the 1999 World Championships in Seville; 52.28 seconds in the 400 metres, achieved in July 2001 in Madrid; and 11.78 seconds in the 100 metres, achieved in August 1999 in Monachil.

References
Sources
sports-reference
Notes

1972 births
Living people
Spanish female sprinters
Athletes (track and field) at the 2000 Summer Olympics
Olympic athletes of Spain
Sportspeople from Seville
Mediterranean Games gold medalists for Spain
Mediterranean Games medalists in athletics
Athletes (track and field) at the 2005 Mediterranean Games
Olympic female sprinters